Szymon Jerzy Ziółkowski (born 1 July 1976 in Poznań) is a retired Polish hammer thrower and an Olympic gold medal winner from Sydney 2000. He also won a gold medal at the 2001 World Championships in Edmonton with a career best throw of 83.38 metres, and two silvers at the 2005 and 2009 editions in Helsinki and Berlin respectively.

Career
Before winning the 2000 Olympic gold medal he had won the gold medal at the 1994 World Junior Championships, finished tenth at the 1996 Olympic Games and fifth at the 1998 European Championships and competed at the 1995 and 1999 World Championships without reaching the final.

After the 2001 season three low-key seasons followed. He competed at the 2004 Olympic Games without reaching the final.

After the 2005 World Championships, he finished fifth at the 2006 European Championships, seventh at the 2007 World Championships and fifth at the 2008 Olympic Games. At the World Athletics Final he finished fifth in 2005, seventh in 2006 and eighth in 2007. In 2009 World Championships in Athletics in Berlin he won silver medal with the result of 79.30m finishing 50 cm behind the Olympic champion of Beijing Primož Kozmus.

As of 2015, he is a member of the Sejm.

National honours
For his sport achievements, he received: 
 Knight's Cross of the Order of Polonia Restituta (5th Class) in 2000.
 Officer's Cross of the Order of Polonia Restituta (4th Class) in 2009.

Competition record

References

1976 births
Living people
Polish male hammer throwers
Athletes (track and field) at the 1996 Summer Olympics
Athletes (track and field) at the 2000 Summer Olympics
Athletes (track and field) at the 2004 Summer Olympics
Athletes (track and field) at the 2008 Summer Olympics
Athletes (track and field) at the 2012 Summer Olympics
Olympic athletes of Poland
Olympic gold medalists for Poland
Sportspeople from Poznań
World Athletics Championships medalists
European Athletics Championships medalists
Medalists at the 2000 Summer Olympics
Olympic gold medalists in athletics (track and field)
Goodwill Games medalists in athletics
World Athletics Championships winners
Competitors at the 2001 Goodwill Games